Øivind Høibak (25 January 1916 – 11 January 1974) was a Norwegian footballer. He played in one match for the Norway national football team in 1947.

References

External links
 

1916 births
1974 deaths
Norwegian footballers
Norway international footballers
Association footballers not categorized by position